Mosaad is an Egyptian surname.

Notable people with this surname include:
 Omar Mosaad (born 1988), Egyptian squash player
 Sayed Mosaad (born 1987), Egyptian footballer

As given name
 Mosaad Megahed (born 1956), Egyptian dermatologist

Egyptian masculine given names